Colonel Matthew Hore (died 1696) was an Irish Confederate and Jacobite politician and soldier.

Hore was the son of John Hore of Shandon, County Waterford and Mary Wadding. In 1642 he attended the Confederate General Assembly in Kilkenny. He fought for the Confederates during the Irish Confederate Wars. Following the Cromwellian Conquest of Ireland, he was deprived of his estates under the Act for the Settlement of Ireland 1652. After the Stuart Restoration, Hore was restored to his estates, amounting to 4,287 acres of land, by the Act of Settlement 1662. He was made a justice of the peace for County Waterford in 1671.

During the Williamite War in Ireland, Hore was appointed a captain, and later a lieutenant colonel, in Richard Grace's regiment of infantry. In 1689, he was elected as a Member of Parliament for Waterford Count in the short-lived Patriot Parliament summoned by James II of England in Dublin. In 1691 he was attainted for treason. He died in 1696. Hore was the father of the Dungarvan Jacobite politicians, John Hore and Martin Hore.

References

Year of birth unknown
1696 deaths
17th-century Irish people
Irish Jacobites
Irish justices of the peace
Irish MPs 1689
Irish Roman Catholic Confederates
Irish soldiers in the army of James II of England
Irish soldiers in the Irish Confederate Wars
Members of the Parliament of Ireland (pre-1801) for County Waterford constituencies
People convicted under a bill of attainder